Trollip is a surname. Notable people with the surname include:

Alfred Ernest Trollip (1895–1972), South African politician
Athol Trollip (born 1964), South African politician